RackaRacka is an Australian YouTube channel created and run by twin filmmaker brothers Danny and Michael Philippou, based in Los Angeles, California (originally from Adelaide, South Australia). The channel is known for its intense live action horror comedy videos. 

Between Facebook and YouTube, RackaRacka has over 2 billion views and over 6 million subscribers.

Named one of Variety magazine's FameChangers, and ranked fifth on the Australian Financial Review’s Cultural Power List, the brothers have won numerous awards including the Best International Channel Streamy Award, Best Overall at the Online Video Awards and the Australian Academy Award for the Best Web Show.

Their debut feature film Talk to Me premiered at the Sundance Film Festival 2023.

History
Danny and Michael began filming their backyard wrestling matches with close friends when they were 11 years old.  At the age of 13, they moved on to making a "TV Show" and "movies".

They created "fake fail" videos for Facebook, but a few months later started the YouTube channel RackaRacka. Initially the channel was not monetized, with Danny financing the videos by volunteering for paid medical trials.

The channel's first huge success was Harry Potter vs Star Wars, which attracted 7 million views in a week. This video won in the Best Comedy and Best Overall categories at the 2014 Australian Online Video Awards. In September 2015, the channel won the award for Best International YouTube Channel at the 6th Streamy Awards.

In 2014, Michael and Danny both crewed on the Australian horror film, The Babdook.

On 10 July 2017, Danny and Michael revealed that they moved into a mansion with their close friends, marking the beginning of a series of videos for the channel titled House of Racka, which combined their real-life adventures and special effects skills altogether into a vlog-like series.  The House of Racka series became the majority of the channel's uploads for around a year. On 2 April 2018, among complaints of YouTube demonetising the channel, the brothers announced that they were being evicted from their mansion. Many fans thought this meant the end of the channel, as the video contained an emotional tribute to the experiences the twins had in the mansion, in a more sombre mood than they usually projected. This was later proven to be false, however, as the two later revealed that the House of Racka series was the only cancellation to their YouTube careers.

On 25 August 2018, Michael fought on the undercard KSI vs Logan Paul boxing event, where he beat Scarce by TKO. Due to lack of demonetisation on the main RackaRacka channel, on 14 December 2019 the brothers created a new channel called Left on Red, vowing to upload a shorter and possibly more marketable video to the channel daily.

On 16 December 2019, the brothers announced that Michael had been charged by South Australia Police with numerous crimes related to a video uploaded on 16 January 2019, which depicted him driving a heavily modified and watertight car on public roads while completely submerged and breathing partially through a hole in the roof. Other claims included that the brothers had been charged for quite a while and were unaware they were being sought by law enforcement; most of them were confirmed when Michael was ordered to appear in court on 14 January 2020.

Film

Talk to Me
In 2020, the twins announced that they would be making their feature-length directorial debut on a horror film titled Talk to Me with Australian production company Causeway Films, which made The Babadook. 

The cast includes Sophie Wilde, Joe Bird, Alexandra Jensen, Otis Dhanji, Zoe Terakes, Chris Alosio, Miranda Otto, Alexandria Steffensen and Marcus Johnson, with the storyline about a young woman who summons dead spirits with a ceramic hand.  

Talk to Me sold to numerous international distributors at Cannes in 2022. It  had a preview screening at the Adelaide Film Festival on 30 October 2022, the closing night of the festival.

The film had its world premiere at the Sundance Film Festival on the 22nd of January 2023. After the premiere spurred a bidding war with Universal and others, A24 acquired the rights to distribute the film in the United States.

It had its European premiere at the Berlin Film Festival on February 21st 2023.

Talk to Me is scheduled to be theatrically released in the United States on July 28, 2023.

Filmography
 Talk to Me (2022)
 Bring Her Back (TBA)

Amateur boxing record
Michael Phillipou

See also 
 Don't Hug Me I'm Scared
 Elsagate
 Toy Freaks
 Happy Tree Friends

References

External links
 
 Left On Red on Youtube

Australian YouTubers
Australian filmmakers
Living people
Australian people of Greek descent
Comedy-related YouTube channels
Streamy Award-winning channels, series or shows
YouTube channels launched in 2013
1992 births
English-language YouTube channels